Kurchatovsky District is an administrative and municipal district (raion), one of the twenty-eight in Kursk Oblast, Russia. It is located in the center of the oblast. Its administrative center is the town of Kurchatov (which is not administratively a part of the district). Population:  19,714 (2002 Census);

Geography
Kurchatovsky District is located in the west central region of Kursk Oblast.  The terrain is hilly plain on the Orel-Kursk plateau of the Central Russian Upland.  The main river in the district is the Seym River.   The district surrounds the city of Kurchatov, and is 25 km west of the city of Kursk and 460 km southwest of Moscow  The area measures 50 km (north-south), and 20 km (west-east).  The administrative center is the town of Kurchatov, Russia

The district is bordered on the north by Konyshyovsky District, on the east by Oktyabrsky District, on the south by Bolshesoldatsky District, and on the west by Lgovsky District.

Administrative and municipal status
Within the framework of administrative divisions, Kurchatovsky District is one of the twenty-eight in the oblast. The town of Kurchatov serves as its administrative center, despite being incorporated separately as a town of oblast significance—an administrative unit with the status equal to that of the districts.

As a municipal division, the district is incorporated as Kurchatovsky Municipal District. The town of oblast significance of Kurchatov is incorporated separately from the district as Kurchatov Urban Okrug.

References

Notes

Sources

External links
Kurchatovsky District on Google Maps
Kurchatovsky District on OpenStreetMap



Districts of Kursk Oblast